Stegosoma is a genus of flies belonging to the family Rhiniidae.

The species of this genus are found in Africa.

Species:
 Stegosoma bowdeni Peris, 1951 
 Stegosoma vinculatum Loew, 1863

References

Rhiniidae
Brachycera genera